One Night Lonely is a 2021 live video album from American country musician Mary Chapin Carpenter. It was recorded and released 25 years after her first live performance video, Jubilee: Live at Wolf Trap, also recorded at the same venue.

Release and reception
The performance followed from a series of "Songs from Home" performances that Carpenter live streamed during the COVID-19 pandemic. Writing for The Arts Desk, Liz Thomson calls this culmination of that series "beautifully shot" and a "a stunning performance" that is "thoughtful, thought-provoking, consoling, and utterly involving". The recording was first made available for digital streaming on November 27, 2020, followed by compact disc and vinyl LP releases on December 4.

The album was nominated for Best Folk Album at the 64th Grammy Awards.

Track listing
"The Age of Miracles" – 5:16
"Chasing What's Already Gone" – 4:48
"Farther Along and Further In" – 3:43
"Sometimes Just the Sky" – 5:13
"I Have a Need for Solitude" – 4:51
"Something Tamed, Something Wild" – 3:58
"Houston" – 5:20
"I Take My Chances" – 3:54
"Grand Central Station" – 4:15
"All Broken Hearts Break Differently" – 3:53
"This Shirt" – 4:58
"I Am a Town" – 5:03
"Stones in the Road" – 4:17
"Heroes and Heroines" – 4:11
"Old D-35" – 5:33
"This Is Love" – 5:10
"John Doe No. 24" – 6:16
"Don't Need Much to Be Happy" – 4:25
"He Thinks He'll Keep Her" – 3:54
"Why Shouldn't We" – 5:04
"Twilight" – 4:29
"Late for Your Life" – 4:24
"The Hard Way" – 4:15
"Between the Dirt and the Stars" – 4:32
"The Things That We Are Made Of" – 5:22
"Traveler's Prayer" – 4:43

Personnel
Mary Chapin Carpenter – acoustic guitar, vocals
Matt Colton – mastering at Metropolis Studios
Aaron Farrington – live event direction
Mike Lane – technical direction
Dominic Monks – mixing
Fenton Williams – live event direction

See also
List of 2021 albums

References

External links

Stream from PBS

2021 live albums
2021 video albums
Mary Chapin Carpenter live albums
Mary Chapin Carpenter video albums
Live video albums